The 2019–20 Coupe de la Ligue, also known as Coupe de la Ligue BKT for sponsorship reasons, was the 26th and final edition of the league cup competition held in France. The competition began with the preliminary round on 26 July 2019.

Strasbourg were the defending champions after defeating Guingamp in the final of the previous edition, but were eliminated in the quarter-finals in a penalty shoot-out to Reims after a goalless draw.

On 18 September 2019, the Ligue de Football Professionnel voted to suspend the competition indefinitely following the 2019–20 edition, in order to "reduce the season schedule".

On 28 April 2020, Prime Minister Edouard Philippe announced all sporting events in France would be cancelled until September. On 26 June, the FFF announced that the final was rescheduled to 31 July.

Paris Saint-Germain won their ninth Coupe de la Ligue title following a 6–5 win on penalties over Lyon in the final.

Preliminary round
A preliminary round match was played on 26 July 2019.

First round
Twelve first round matches were played on 13 August 2019.

Second round
Six second round matches were played on 27 August 2019.

Third round
The draw for the third round of matches was held on 19 September 2019.

Round of 16
The draw for the Round of 16 matches was held on 12 November 2019.

Quarter-finals
The draw for the quarter-final matches was held on 18 December 2019.

Semi-finals
The draw for the semi-final matches was held on 9 January 2020.

Final

The final was originally scheduled for 4 April 2020 but was postponed due to concerns over the COVID-19 pandemic.

See also
 2019–20 Ligue 1
 2019–20 Ligue 2

Notes

References

External links
 Official website  

2019-20
France 2
League Cup
Association football events postponed due to the COVID-19 pandemic